The ATP Tour is the elite tour for professional tennis organized by the ATP. The 2001 ATP Tour included the four Grand Slam tournaments, the Tennis Masters Cup, the Tennis Masters Series, the International Series Gold and the International Series.

Schedule and results 
This is the complete schedule of events on the 2001 ATP Tour, with player progression documented from the quarterfinal stage.

Key

January

February

March

April 
{| class=wikitable style=font-size:95%
|-
! style="width:50px;"|Week
! style="width:240px;"|Tournament
! style="width:200px;" |Champions
! style="width:200px;" |Runners-up
! style="width:190px;" |Semifinalists
! style="width:190px;" |Quarterfinalists

|-valign=top
|2 Apr||style="background:#ECF2FF;"|Davis Cup quarterfinalsFlorianópolis, Brazil – Clay (Red)Malmö, Sweden – Hard (i) Neuchâtel, Switzerland – Carpet (i) 's-Hertogenbosch, Netherlands – Carpet (i) || 4–1 4–1 3–2 4–1||||bgcolor=#ededed| ||bgcolor=#ededed|

|-valign=top
|rowspan=4|9 Apr ||rowspan=2| Grand Prix Hassan II Casablanca, MoroccoATP International Series$350,000 – Clay  Singles – Doubles ||  Guillermo Cañas 7–5, 6–2|| Tommy Robredo ||rowspan=2|  Younes El Aynaoui  Sergi Bruguera ||rowspan=2| Mariano Zabaleta   Germán Puentes  Andrea Gaudenzi    Attila Sávolt
|-valign=top
| Michael Hill Jeff Tarango 7–6(7–2), 6–3 ||  Pablo Albano David MacPherson

|-valign=top
|rowspan=2| Estoril Open  Oeiras, PortugalATP International Series$625,000 – Clay  Singles – Doubles ||  Juan Carlos Ferrero 7–6(7–3), 4–6, 6–3|| Félix Mantilla ||rowspan=2|  Albert Portas  Andrei Pavel ||rowspan=2| Albert Montañés   Dominik Hrbatý  Franco Squillari    Markus Hipfl
|-valign=top
| Radek Štěpánek Michal Tabara 6–4, 6–2 ||  Donald Johnson Nenad Zimonjić

|-valign=top
|rowspan=2|16 Apr ||bgcolor=#E9E9E9 rowspan=2| Monte Carlo Masters Roquebrune-Cap-Martin, FranceTennis Masters Series$2,950,000 – Clay  Singles – Doubles ||  Gustavo Kuerten 6–3, 6–2, 6–4|| Hicham Arazi ||rowspan=2|  Sébastien Grosjean  Guillermo Coria ||rowspan=2| Roger Federer   Tim Henman  Alberto Martín    Sjeng Schalken
|-valign=top
| Jonas Björkman Todd Woodbridge 3–6, 6–4, 6–2 ||  Joshua Eagle Andrew Florent

|-valign=top
|rowspan=4|23 Apr ||bgcolor=#DDF3D1 rowspan=2| Open SEAT Godó Barcelona, SpainATP International Series Gold$1,000,000 – Clay  Singles – Doubles ||  Juan Carlos Ferrero 4–6, 7–5, 6–3, 3–6, 7–5|| Carlos Moyà ||rowspan=2|  Thomas Enqvist  Michel Kratochvil ||rowspan=2| Federico Luzzi   Àlex Corretja  Félix Mantilla    Albert Portas
|-valign=top
| Donald Johnson Jared Palmer 7–6(7–2), 6–4 ||  Tommy Robredo Fernando Vicente

|-valign=top
|rowspan=2| Verizon Tennis Challenge Atlanta, USATP International Series$400,000 – Clay  Singles – Doubles ||  Andy Roddick 6–2, 6–4|| Xavier Malisse ||rowspan=2|  Jérôme Golmard  Stefan Koubek ||rowspan=2| Christophe Rochus   Andrew Ilie  Hyung-Taik Lee    Fernando Meligeni
|-valign=top
| Mahesh Bhupathi Leander Paes 6–3, 7–6(9–7) ||  Rick Leach David MacPherson

|-valign=top
|rowspan=6|30 Apr ||rowspan=2| U.S. Clay Court Championships Houston, USATP International Series$350,000 – Clay – 32S/16D  Singles – Doubles||  Andy Roddick 7–5, 6–3|| Hyung-Taik Lee ||rowspan=2|  Jérôme Golmard  Michal Tabara ||rowspan=2| Stefan Koubek   Jiří Vaněk  Olivier Rochus    Andrew Ilie
|-valign=top
| Mahesh Bhupathi Leander Paes 7–6(7–4), 6–2 ||  Kevin Kim Jim Thomas

|-valign=top
|rowspan=2| Majorca Open Mallorca, SpainATP International Series$500,000 – Clay  Singles – Doubles ||  Alberto Martín 6–3, 3–6, 6–2|| Guillermo Coria ||rowspan=2|  Juan Balcells  Carlos Moyà ||rowspan=2| Agustín Calleri   Juan Antonio Marín  Nicolas Kiefer    Slava Doseděl
|-valign=top
| Donald Johnson Jared Palmer 7–5, 6–3 ||  Feliciano López Francisco Roig

|-valign=top
|rowspan=2| BMW Open  Munich, GermanyATP International Series$400,000 – Clay  Singles – Doubles ||  Jiří Novák 6–4, 7–5|| Antony Dupuis ||rowspan=2|  Younes El Aynaoui  Bohdan Ulihrach ||rowspan=2| Tomas Behrend   Flávio Saretta  Franco Squillari    Wayne Arthurs
|-valign=top
| Petr Luxa Radek Štěpánek 5–7, 6–2, 7–6(7–5)||  Jaime Oncins Daniel Orsanic
|}

 May 

 June 

 July 

 August 

 September 

 October 

 November 

 Statistical information 
List of players and titles won (Grand Slam and Masters Cup titles in bold), listed in order of most titles won:
  Lleyton Hewitt – Sydney, London Queen's Club, 's-Hertogenbosch, US Open, Tokyo and Masters Cup (6)
  Gustavo Kuerten – Buenos Aires, Acapulco, Monte Carlo Masters, French Open, Stuttgart Outdoor and Cincinnati Masters (6)
  Andre Agassi – Australian Open, Indian Wells Masters, Miami Masters and Los Angeles (4)
  Juan Carlos Ferrero – Dubai, Estoril, Barcelona and Rome Masters (4)
  Tommy Haas – Adelaide, Long Island, Vienna and Stuttgart Masters (4)
  Andy Roddick – Atlanta, Houston and Washington, D.C. (3)
  Andrea Gaudenzi – St. Poelten and Båstad (2)
  Tim Henman – Copenhagen and Basel (2)
  Thomas Johansson – Halle and Nottingham (2)
  Yevgeny Kafelnikov – Marseille and Moscow (2)
  Jiří Novák – Munich and Gstaad (2)
  Marcelo Ríos – Doha and Hong Kong (2)
  Marat Safin – Tashkent and St. Petersburg (2)
  Guillermo Cañas – Casablanca (1)
  Francisco Clavet – Scottsdale (1)
  Guillermo Coria – Viña del Mar (1)
  Àlex Corretja – Amsterdam (1)
  Younes El Aynaoui – Bucharest (1)
  Nicolas Escudé – Rotterdam (1)
  Roger Federer – Milan (1)
  Jan-Michael Gambill – Delray Beach (1)
  Neville Godwin – Newport (1)
  Sébastien Grosjean – Paris Masters (1)
  Dominik Hrbatý – Auckland (1)
  Goran Ivanišević – Wimbledon (1)
  Nicolás Lapentti – Kitzbühel (1)
  Ivan Ljubičić – Lyon (1)
  Félix Mantilla – Palermo (1)
  Alberto Martín – Mallorca (1)
  Carlos Moyà – Umag (1)
  Andrei Pavel – Canada Masters (1)
  Mark Philippoussis – Memphis (1)
  Albert Portas – Hamburg Masters (1)
  Patrick Rafter – Indianapolis (1)
  Tommy Robredo – Sopot (1)
  Greg Rusedski – San Jose (1)
  Sjeng Schalken – Stockholm (1)
  Rainer Schüttler – Shanghai (1)
  Michal Tabara – Chennai (1)
  Jan Vacek – Salvador (1)
  Fernando Vicente – Bogotá (1)

The following players won their first title:
  Guillermo Cañas – Casablanca
  Guillermo Coria – Viña del Mar
  Roger Federer – Milan
  Neville Godwin – Newport
  Ivan Ljubičić – Lyon
  Albert Portas – Hamburg Masters
  Tommy Robredo – Sopot
  Andy Roddick – Atlanta
  Michal Tabara – Chennai
  Jan Vacek – Salvador

Titles won by nation:
  Spain 12 (Bogotá, Dubai, Scottsdale, Estoril, Barcelona, Mallorca, Rome Masters, Hamburg Masters, Amsterdam, Umag, Sopot and Palermo)
  Australia 8 (Sydney, Memphis, London Queen's Club, 's-Hertogenbosch, Indianapolis, US Open, Tokyo and Masters Cup)
  United States 8 (Australian Open, Delray Beach, Indian Wells Masters, Miami Masters, Atlanta, Houston, Los Angeles and Washington, D.C.)
  Brazil 6 (Buenos Aires, Acapulco, Monte Carlo Masters, French Open, Stuttgart Outdoor and Cincinnati Masters)
  Germany 5 (Adelaide, Long Island, Shanghai, Vienna and Stuttgart Masters)
  Czech Republic 4 (Chennai, Munich, Gstaad and Salvador)
  Russia 4 (Marseille, Tashkent, Moscow and St. Petersburg)
  United Kingdom 3 (Copenhagen, San Jose and Basel)
  Argentina 2 (Viña del Mar and Casablanca)
  Chile 2 (Doha and Hong Kong)
  Croatia 2 (Wimbledon''' and Lyon)
  France 2 (Rotterdam and Paris Masters)
  Italy 2 (St. Poelten and Båstad)
  Sweden 2 (Halle and Nottingham)
  Ecuador 1 (Kitzbühel)
  Morocco 1 (Bucharest)
  Netherlands 1 (Stockholm)
  Romania 1 (Canada Masters)
  Slovakia 1 (Auckland)
  South Africa 1 (Newport)
  Switzerland 1 (Milan)

ATP entry rankings

Singles 
ATP rankings

Retirements 
Following is a list of notable players (winners of a main tour title, and/or part of the ATP rankings top 100 (singles) or top 50 (doubles) for at least one week) who announced their retirement from professional tennis, became inactive (after not playing for more than 52 weeks), or were permanently banned from playing, during the 2001 season:

  Julián Alonso (born August 2, 1977, in Canet de Mar, Spain) He turned professional in 1996 and reached his career-high ranking of no. 30 in 1998. He earned two career titles.
  Alberto Berasategui (born 28 June 1973 in Bilbao, Spain) He turned professional in 1991 and reached a career-high ranking of world no. 7. He reached the final of the French Open in 1994 and the quarterfinals of the Australian Open. He earned 14 ATP titles. He played his last career match in Barcelona in March against Álex Calatrava
  Tomás Carbonell (born 7 August 1968 in Barcelona, Spain) His highest singles ranking was world no. 40. He earned two singles titles and 22 doubles titles. His career-high doubles ranking was no. 22, and he twice reached the semifinals of the French Open (1999 and 2000). He played his last career match in Lyon in October partnering Lucas Arnold Ker.
  Filip Dewulf (born 15 March 1972 in Mol, Belgium) He turned professional in 1990 and reached his career-high ranking of world no. 39 in 1997. He earned two career ATP titles and played his last match in Magdeburg, Germany in March against Michaël Llodra.
  Ctislav Doseděl (born 10 August 1970 in Přerov, Czechoslovakia) He turned professional in 1989 and reached his career-high ranking of no. 26 in 1994. He reached the quarterfinals of the US Open in 1999 and earned three career singles titles and one doubles title.
  Hernán Gumy (born 5 March 1972 in Buenos Aires, Argentina) He turned professional in 1991 and reached his career-high ranking of no. 39 in 1996. He earned one career title and played his last match in Biella, Italy in June against Solon Peppas.
  Sébastien Lareau (born 27 April 1973 in Montreal, Canada) He turned professional in 1991 and reached his highest doubles ranking of world no. 4 in 1999. He earned 17 doubles titles and an Olympic gold medal in 2000. His last career match was at the US Open partnering Ben Ellwood.
  Andriy Medvedev (born 31 August 1974 in Kyiv) He turned professional in 1991 and reached a career-high ranking of world no. 4. He won 11 career ATP titles and was a finalist at the French Open in 1999, a semifinalist at the year-end finals in 1993, and a quarterfinalist at the Australian and US Opens. In all, he won 19 career doubles titles. He played his last career match in St. Petersburg in October against Stefan Koubek.
  Piet Norval (born 7 April 1970 in Bellville, Cape Town, South Africa) He turned professional in 1988 and reached a career-high doubles ranking of world no. 16 in 1995. He was a semifinalist at Wimbledon and a quarterfinalist at the three other Grand Slam tournaments. He also won the year-end doubles finals in 2000 and a silver medal at the 1992 Olympics. He earned a total of 14 doubles ATP titles. His last match was at the Australian Open partnering Donald Johnson.
  Jaime Oncins (born 16 June 1970 in São Paulo, Brazil) He turned professional in 1988 and reached his career-high ranking of world no. 34 in 1993. He earned two career singles ATP titles and five doubles titles. His highest doubles ranking was no. 22. His final singles and doubles matches were both in Brazil in September.
  Francisco Roig, who had retired from singles two years prior, officially retired from doubles at the close of the 2001 season. Nevertheless, his final professional match would take place in 2014.
  Jonathan Stark (born 3 April 1971 in Medford, Oregon) He turned professional in 1991 and reached a career-high ranking of world no. 36, earning two singles titles. In doubles, he was ranked world no. 1. He won the French Open in 1994, was a semifinalist at the Australian Open, and a quarterfinalist at Wimbledon and the US Open. He played his last career singles match in June in Nottingham and his last career doubles match in October in St. Petersburg partnering Justin Gimelstob.
  Jason Stoltenberg (born 4 April 1970 in Narrabri, Australia) He turned professional in 1987 and reached a career-high ranking of world no. 19 in 1994. He reached the semifinals at Wimbledon in 1996 and earned four career singles titles. In doubles, he reached a career-high ranking of no. 23 in 1991 and earned five career titles. He played his last career match at Wimbledon against Juan Carlos Ferrero. He had a brilliant Juniors career, winning the Australian Open, being a finalist at the French Open and Wimbledon, and a semifinalist at the US Open, all in 1987. He is perhaps the only player on tour to have gotten started in tennis playing on a crushed termite mound court.
  David Wheaton (born 2 June 1969 in Minneapolis, Minnesota) He turned professional in 1988 and reached his career-high singles ranking of world no. 12 in 1991. He reached the semifinals at Wimbledon in 1991 and the quarterfinals of the Australian Open and the US Open in 1990. He earned three career singles titles. In doubles, he was ranked no. 24 in 1991 and earned three titles. He played his last career match in Knoxville, Tennessee, in November partnering Eric Taino.
  Chris Woodruff (born 3 January 1973 in Knoxville, Tennessee) He turned professional in 1993 and reached his highest career ranking of world no. 29 in 1997. He reached the quarterfinals of the Australian Open in 2000 and earned two career titles. He played his last career match in Tyler, Texas, in November against Gabriel Trifu.

See also 
 2001 WTA Tour

References

External links 
 Association of Tennis Professionals (ATP) official website

 
ATP Tour
ATP Tour seasons